Pratulum is a genus of marine bivalve molluscs in the family Cardiidae.

Distribution
This genus is endemic to Australia and New Zealand.

Species in the genus Pratulum
 Pratulum catinus (P. A. Maxwell, 1992) †
 Pratulum finlayi (Bartrum & Powell, 1928) †
 Pratulum marwicki (Beu & P. A. Maxwell, 1990) †
 Pratulum modicum (Marwick, 1944) †
 Pratulum occidentale Poutiers, 2017
 Pratulum pulchellum (Gray, 1843)
 Pratulum quinarium (Marwick, 1944) †
 Pratulum semitectum (Marwick, 1926) †
 Pratulum thetidis (Hedley, 1902)

References

 Powell A. W. B., New Zealand Mollusca, William Collins Publishers Ltd, Auckland, New Zealand 1979 

Cardiidae
Bivalve genera
Bivalves of Australia
Bivalves of New Zealand